Tom Gorman and Stan Smith were the defending champions, but lost in the semifinals this year.

Tom Okker and Marty Riessen won the title, defeating Roy Emerson and Colin Dibley 7–5, 7–6 in the final.

Seeds

Draw

Finals

Top half

Bottom half

External links
 Draw

Stockholm Open
1972 Grand Prix (tennis)